"" is the sixth single by Shiori Takei and released February 1, 2006 under Giza Studio label. The single reached #56 rank first week. It charted for 3 weeks and sold over 3,737 copies.

Track list
All songs has been arranged by Satoru Kobayashi

lyricist: Nana Azuki (Garnet Crow)/composer: Keika
the song was used as ending theme for anime MÄR

lyricist: Shiori Takei/composer: Maki Imai

lyricist and composer: Shiori Takei
it's Shiori's first composed song
 (less vocal)

References

2006 singles
2006 songs
Being Inc. singles
Giza Studio singles
Anime songs
Songs with lyrics by Nana Azuki
2000s ballads